Stephen Christopher Crowley (born 8 December 1961) is a former English cricketer.  Crowley is a right-handed batsman who fielded as a wicket-keeper.  He was born in Hillingdon, Middlesex.

Crowley made his debut for Norfolk in the 1993 MCCA Knockout Trophy against Bedfordshire.  Crowley played Minor counties cricket for Norfolk from 1993 to 1996, which included 27 Minor Counties Championship matches and 5 MCCA Knockout Trophy matches.   He made his List A debut against the Warwickshire in the 1993 NatWest Trophy.  He made 3 further List A appearances, the last coming against Hampshire in the 1996 NatWest Trophy.  In his 4 List A matches, he scored 5 runs at an average of 1.66, with a high score of 2 not out.  Behind the stumps he took 4 catches and 2 stumpings.

References

External links
Stephen Crowley at ESPNcricinfo
Stephen Crowley at CricketArchive

1961 births
Living people
People from Hillingdon
English cricketers
Norfolk cricketers
Wicket-keepers